Nina Kusturica is a Bosnian-born Austrian film director, film editor and film producer.

Biography

She studied at the University of Music and Performing Arts, Vienna to become a film director and editor and earned her degree with the film Auswege, which had its premiere at the Berlin International Film Festival in the International Forum of New Cinema. It also opened the Diagonale – the Festival of Austrian Film – in 2003. In the same year, Nina Kusturica and Eva Testor founded the production company Mobilefilm in Vienna.

In 2009, Nina Kusturica's documentary Little Alien had its premiere – once again at the Diagonale. The documentary about unaccompanied minor refugees also went on tour to reach Austrian pupils and students with a special concept consisting of the projection of the film followed by a discussions with the director and/or protagonists. In 2010, Nina Kusturica was awarded the outstanding artist award in the category of 'Intercultural dialogue' of the Federal Ministry for Education, Arts and Culture for her special commitment.

Kusturic is involved in the Austrian citizens' initiative Machen wir uns STARK which demands a change in current politics, above all concerning integration and education.

Filmography 

director, producer, editor (selection)

1998 Ich bin der neue Star, documentary, 15 min., director, script
1999 Wishes, short film, 20 min., director, script
2000 Draga Ljiljana - Dear Ljiliana, documentary, 31 min., director, script
2001 Der Freiheit, short film, 14 min., director, script
2003 Auswege, feature film, 90 min., director, script
2004 24 Realities per Second, a documentary on Michael Haneke, 58 min., director, editing, production
2009 Little Alien, documentary, 94 min., director, script, editing

producer / editor (selection)

1997 Speak Easy, short film, editing
1999 Lesen macht tot, feature film, editing
2002 Laut und deutlich, documentary, editing
2005 Kotsch, feature film, editing
2007 Auf dem Strich - Paul Flora im Film documentary, production
2007 Vienna's Lost Daughters, feature documentary, production, editing

Awards 

2006 Diagonale, Best Editing Feature Film together with Bernhard Schmid for Kotsch
 2010 outstanding artist award, category: intercultural dialogue, of the Federal Ministry for Education, Arts and Culture, 2010
 2010 Feature Documentary – 2nd place, Editing – 1st place for Little Alien, International Filmfestival Los Angeles, 2010

External links 
 Mobilefilm Production
 Little Alien
 
 Machen wir uns STARK

References 

Bosnia and Herzegovina film directors
Bosnia and Herzegovina women film directors
Bosnia and Herzegovina film editors
Austrian screenwriters
Austrian people of Bosnia and Herzegovina descent
Bosnia and Herzegovina film producers
Bosnia and Herzegovina women film producers
Austrian film directors
Austrian film producers
Austrian women film directors
Austrian women film producers
German-language film directors
Bosnia and Herzegovina human rights activists
Austrian human rights activists
Women human rights activists
Living people
1975 births
Austrian film editors
People from Mostar
Women film editors